Biko Wolfgang Adema (born September 1, 1987) is a Kenyan rugby sevens player. He was a member of Kenya's squad for the 2013 Rugby World Cup Sevens.

References

External links 
 
 
 

1987 births
Living people
Rugby sevens players at the 2016 Summer Olympics
Olympic rugby sevens players of Kenya
Kenya international rugby sevens players
Male rugby sevens players
Kenyan rugby union players
Daystar University alumni